Jansson's Temptation (Swedish: Janssons frestelse) is a 1928 Swedish silent comedy film directed by Sigurd Wallén and starring Oscar Byström, Margita Alfvén and Edvin Adolphson. It was shot at the Råsunda Studios in Stockholm. The film's sets were designed by the art director Vilhelm Bryde. The film is based on a play of the same name by Wallén, which takes its takes its title from the Swedish casserole dish Jansson's temptation.

Cast
 Oscar Byström as 	Baron Casimir von Werne
 Margita Alfvén as 	Inga
 Edvin Adolphson as Gunnar Jansson
 Stina Berg as 	Bernhardina
 Lars Egge as Axel Hall
 Jullan Kindahl as 	Kerstin

References

Bibliography
 Gustafsson, Tommy. Masculinity in the Golden Age of Swedish Cinema: A Cultural Analysis of 1920s Films. McFarland, 2014.
 Qvist, Per Olov & von Bagh, Peter. Guide to the Cinema of Sweden and Finland. Greenwood Publishing Group, 2000.

External links

1928 films
1928 comedy films
Swedish comedy films
Swedish silent feature films
Swedish black-and-white films
Films directed by Sigurd Wallén
1920s Swedish-language films
Swedish films based on plays
Silent comedy films
1920s Swedish films